The 1957 Eastern Michigan Hurons football team represented Eastern Michigan College (renamed Eastern Michigan University in 1959) in the Interstate Intercollegiate Athletic Conference (IIAC) during the 1957 NCAA College Division football season. In their sixth season under head coach Fred Trosko, the Hurons compiled a 6–3 record (6–0 against IIAC opponents), won the IIAC championship, and outscored their opponents, 237 to 127. The team defeated all six of its conference opponents by at least three touchdowns. Dr. Walter Gerald Brown was the team captain. Kerry Keating led the team with 563 yards of total offense, 563 rushing yards, 153 receiving yards, 15 touchdowns, and 90 points scored. Keating also received the team's most valuable player award. It was the last conference championship season for three decades.

Schedule

References

Eastern Michigan
Eastern Michigan Eagles football seasons
Interstate Intercollegiate Athletic Conference football champion seasons
Eastern Michigan Hurons football